Tomentum may refer to:

 Plant trichomes, a covering of closely matted or fine hairs on plant leaves. 
 Tomentum (anatomy), short, soft pubescence or a covering of fine, soft hairs.